The Different Being is a 2017 Italian horror-suspense short film, written, directed and edited by Rosario Brucato. The film deals with the theme of diversity in a social context that does not accept the physical malformations of the human being and that, therefore, trigger serious mental illnesses in the subjects who are affected, negatively affecting the social sphere. The film was distributed by Amazon Prime Video.

Plot
Richard Blanz with social problems finds comfort only from the mother who urges him not to close in the house and above all not to get caught. The psychiatrist Fergurson diagnoses a social problem more than psychological.
In Richard, with age advancing, he hates all those who mock him and acts violently with a girl who is deformed, talking to her friend hinting at the hunchback. It's Richard who is secluded in a bushy corner and hears them. Richard follows them when he finds the identity card of the young man who laughed at him. He goes to his home where he can enter while the victim reads a book on the bed. The girl smiles in the stairs and goes down to the kitchen to close the door with the key. Richard is already at home and is staging him...

Cast
 Giuseppe Brucato as Richard Blanz
 Veronica Brucato as victim
 Gaetana Fazio as Richard's mother
 Daniela Scancarello Gaetana as victim's friend
 Davide La Noce as psychiatrist Fergurson
 Calogero Ettore Cifalà as Richard Blanz (child)
 Francesca Valeria Ventre as Richard's mother (young)
 Salvatore Pantano as Richard's visitor

Awards and nominations
The film was shot at zero budget and has received various nominations and victories at various international festivals, mainly in Los Angeles and Hollywood

References

External links

2010s Italian-language films
2017 short films
Italian short films
2017 films